Riadh Khedher (born 1 July 1972) is an Iraqi weightlifter. He competed in the men's featherweight event at the 1992 Summer Olympics.

References

1972 births
Living people
Iraqi male weightlifters
Olympic weightlifters of Iraq
Weightlifters at the 1992 Summer Olympics
Place of birth missing (living people)
20th-century Iraqi people